The  is a mini MPV manufactured and marketed by Suzuki since 1997. The preceding model and the first generation Solio were derived from the narrower Wagon R.



Predecessor: Wagon R-Wide (MA61S/MB61S; 1997) 

The predecessor to the Solio, the Wagon R-Wide, was introduced in February 1997, as a slightly larger version of the Wagon R, exceeding the kei car specifications, with larger engines of 1 or 1.2 liters. The Wagon R-Wide was sold as the Wagon R+ in the European market (also introduced in the same year) with the atmospheric versions of the 1.0 K10A and the 1.2 K12A. The only other tall wagon style car sold in Europe around the time of its introduction was the Daihatsu Move. The car was made in Japan. It was not galvanised and it was prone to rust, especially in the sills, after years of use in Central and Northern Europe. The Wagon R-Wide was slightly facelifted in May 1998, and this updated Wagon R-Wide was also sold in Europe under Wagon R+. In Europe, the first-generation Wagon R+ was sold from 1997 until May 2000.

The engines were the 996 cc K10A, in naturally aspirated or turbocharged forms, or the later 1171 cc naturally aspirated K12A. The naturally aspirated K10A produces  and 88 Nm. The turbocharged version was only available in Japan, New Zealand, and Australia; it puts out  and 118 Nm. The 1.2-litre K12A engine produces  and 93 Nm. The larger engine was the only one offered in conjunction with four-wheel drive in Europe.

Between 1999 and 2001, it was also built in Colombia by GM Colmotores, who sold it as the Chevrolet Wagon R+. This was equipped with the naturally aspirated K10A four-cylinder engine.

In Indonesia, the facelifted Japanese Wagon R-Wide was sold as the Suzuki Karimun and was produced locally from 1999 until 2006 and offered with a 1.0-liter petrol engine, whilst in China it forms the base for Changhe Beidouxing. The Big Dipper is available with an indigenously built 1.0-liter engine based on the old F10A, or with the more modern 1.4-liter K14B engine.

First generation (MA63S/MA64S/MA32S; 1999) 

The Wagon R+ was launched in May 1999 in Japan, replacing the Wagon R-Wide. This updated version started sales in the European market in the summer of 2000. The main difference between the JDM Wagon R+ and the European Wagon R+ is the door handles, which on JDM models were body-colored while European models received black door handles.

In December 2000, the Japanese-spec model was renamed Wagon R Solio, and this was available both in the bottom-of-the-line X trim level and in a more sports-oriented trim level known as the 1.3. In June 2002, the 1.0 E trim level was added to the Wagon R-Solio lineup. In August 2003, a mid-facelift Wagon R-Solio was released. In April 2004, the Wagon R-Solio was renamed Solio, losing the Wagon R moniker entirely. In August 2005, a facelifted Solio was launched.

The Hungarian-built Wagon R+ is still being produced for the European market (in 2008, Wagon R-Solio and Solio are not sold), albeit with limited range and availability (it is no longer for sale in Ireland, for example). As of 2006 in the UK, only one model is available – the GL, with a 1.3 litre (1298 cc) 16 valve 4-cylinder petrol engine delivering , ABS with EBD and air conditioning as options. The current model is  x  x  (length x width x height), with a claimed  of cargo space. It was too difficult for either the Wagon R-Solio or Solio to meet with Euro NCAP crash safety ratings. As a result, the Wagon R+ continued in Europe until late 2008, when replaced by the Splash.

From 2000 until 2007, the Wagon R+ is rebadged as Opel/Vauxhall Agila. The Agila was built at an Opel factory in Gliwice, Poland and used Opel Engines and transmissions. The last Agila was a rebadged Splash.

Second generation (MA15S; 2010) 

While the kei-version of the Wagon R went through third and fourth generations, the wider Solio remained in its first-generation until undergoing a full model change in December 2010. The second-generation Solio was released on 7 January 2011 and is based on the Palette instead of the Wagon R, although the Palette itself uses the Wagon R's platform. This generation of Solio (MA15) also provides the basis for an OEM deal with Mitsubishi Motors, rebadged as the Mitsubishi Delica D:2, which was released in March 2011. In Japan, it was sold at a specific retail chain called Car Plaza.

Third generation (MA26S/MA36S/MA46S; 2015) 

The third-generation Solio was released in Japan on 26 August 2015.

Fourth generation (MA27S/MA37S; 2020) 

The fourth-generation Solio was released in Japan on 25 November 2020.

References

External links 

  (Solio)
  (Solio Bandit)

Solio
Cars introduced in 1999
2000s cars
2010s cars
2020s cars
Mini MPVs
Front-wheel-drive vehicles
All-wheel-drive vehicles
Vehicles with CVT transmission